The Purple Horizon is a 1971 Vietnamese 35mm eastmancolor film directed by Lê Hoàng Hoa.

Plot
A love story between an Army Corporal and a Jazz singer in a land torn apart by war between freedom and oppression is a portrait of love, lost and sacrifices by millions of young men and women during 20 years of resistance against communism. Where the heroes are just ordinary men, men who are willing to sacrifice everything for their country.

Production
Location is Saigon during 3 months of the year 1971.

Art
 Type : Romance, war, feature.
 Studio : Mỹ Vân Films (Mỹ-Vân Điện-ảnh Công-ti), Liên Ảnh Motion Picture (Liên-Ảnh Công-ti)
 Print : National Cinema Centre (Trung-tâm Quốc-gia Điện-ảnh)
 Digital : Spectra Films Studio (2015)
 Director : Lê Hoàng Hoa
 Screenplay : Văn Quang
 Dialogue : Mai Thảo

Cast

 Hùng Cường ... Phi
 Kim Vui ... Liên
 Thanh Lan ... Phượng
 Mộng Tuyền ... Loan
 Ánh Nga
 Bảo Ân ... Điền
 Ngọc Đức
 Hà Huyền Chi
 Khả Năng
 Trần Đỗ Cung
 Ngọc Phu
 Khả Năng
 Tùng Lâm
 Xuân Phát
 Bà Năm Sadec

References

 
 
 Điện ảnh Việt Nam Cộng hòa một thuở : Chân trời tím và cuộc tình bất ngờ
 Nữ minh tinh Kim Vui tưởng nhớ người bạn diễn Ngọc Đức và phim Chân trời tím
 Nữ minh tinh Kim Vui tưởng nhớ kịch sĩ, tài tử Ngọc Đức vừa mất ngày 25 tháng 3 năm 12
 Buồn vui phim Chân trời tím ngày xưa

Lê Hoàng Hoa
Vietnamese romance films
Vietnamese musical films
Films based on works by Vietnamese writers
1963 films